New York's 21st State Assembly district is one of the 150 districts in the New York State Assembly. It has been represented by Brian Curran since 2023, defeating Judy Griffin. He previously represented the district between 2011 and 2018.

Geography
District 21 is located entirely within Nassau County. It includes the towns of Lynbrook, Rockville Centre, Malverne, South Hempstead, Baldwin and parts of Freeport, West Hempstead, Oceanside, East Rockaway, Lakeview, Hewlett, Hempstead, Franklin Square, and Valley Stream.

Recent election results

2022

2020

2018

2016

2014

2012

References

21
Nassau County, New York